List of A roads in zone 5 in Great Britain starting north/east of the A5, west of the A6, south of the Solway Firth/Eden Estuary (roads beginning with 5).

Single- and double-digit roads

Three-digit roads

Four-digit roads (50xx)

Four-digit roads (51xx)

Four-digit roads (52xx)

Four-digit roads (53xx to 57xx)

References

 5
 
5